The 2023 Nigerian presidential election in Lagos State was held on 25 February 2023 as part of the nationwide 2023 Nigerian presidential election to elect the president and vice president of Nigeria. Other federal elections, including elections to the House of Representatives and the Senate, were also held on the same date while state elections will be held two weeks afterward on 11 March.

Peter Obi—the nominee of the Labour Party—won the state by nearly 10,000 votes, a 0.77% margin, in a massive upset over former state Governor Bola Tinubu of the All Progressives Congress. The other two major contenders, Atiku Abubakar (Peoples Democratic Party) and Rabiu Kwankwaso (New Nigeria Peoples Party), trailed with just 5.96% and 0.66%, respectively.

Background
Lagos State is a highly populated, diverse southwestern state that is a major financial centre along with being a key culture, education, and transportation hub. Although it faces overcrowding and chronic debilitating traffic, it has grown to one of the largest economies in Africa.

Politically, the 2019 elections were a continuation of the state APC's control as Muhammadu Buhari won the state by 12% and the party held all three senate seats while gaining in the House of Representatives elections. On the state level, the APC also retained its House of Assembly majority but the gubernatorial election was prefaced by the unprecedented defeat of incumbent Akinwunmi Ambode in the APC primary, marking the first time an incumbent Nigerian governor was defeated in a party primary. His primary challenger, Babajide Sanwo-Olu, went on to win the general election by a wide 54% margin.

Campaign 
Although Lagos State is the home state of Tinubu, both Abubakar and Obi pushed to make the state competitive by targeting certain demographics and using the downballot candidates of their respective parties to lead the direct grassroots campaign. As a state in the ethnic Yoruba homeland of Yorubaland, most of Lagos State's indigenous population are ethnic Yoruba but over a century of internal migration led to a significant minority of non-Yoruba non-indigenes. These differing ethnic dynamics greatly affected the presidential campaign in the state as Tinubu (an ethnic Yoruba himself) and his surrogates extensively employed ethnic Yoruba identity politics while campaigning across the South West; on the other hand, the Lagos State bases of both Abubakar and Obi are in the non-indigene community—primarily those originally from the South East or South South—along with youths and  educated professionals of all ethnicities.

Soon after the campaign period began in September 2022, reports from the LP and the PDP emerged over continuous attempts at suppression from APC-backed assailants along with bias from the state government and local police. Notable incidents included an ambush on the state PDP campaign convoy in Badagry in October and an attack on Obi-aligned free medical services in Eti-Osa in November. The reports led to fears of electoral violence and voter suppression, with analysts noting the regular reports of suppression and violence from the recent elections in the state (especially in areas with a non-Yoruba majority). As the campaign continued into December, the administration of state governor Babajide Sanwo-Olu (APC)—a longtime Tinubu ally—was accused of abusing the power of government for political purposes after reports found that the Lagos State Traffic Management Authority was selectively closing roads and diverting traffic for only APC campaign events. As the election neared in January, suppression reports increased rapidly with both the LP and PDP accusing the state government and APC of destroying opposition banners and posters, attacking and intimidating of opposition supporters, and continued prevention of using billboards with the LP even claiming that the APC had infiltrated local INEC offices to discard the Permanent Voter Cards of non-indigenes.

While both SBM Intelligence and ThisDay projected Tinubu to win Lagos State in December 2022, other pundits noted the potential competitiveness of the state with The Africa Report including it in a series on battleground states. The article contended that Tinubu would benefit from the support of the state and federal government in the state, both from the ability to suppress opposition voters and recent infrastructure projects. For Abubakar, reporting focused on the divides within the PDP as the national split between the G5 and the rest of the party had trickled down to the Lagos State PDP as longtime state PDP stalwart Bode George sided with the G5 in its opposition to Abubakar. The split in the state PDP had its gubernatorial nominee—Abdul-Azeez Olajide Adediran—campaigning for Abubakar while George reportedly backed Obi and LP gubernatorial nominee Gbadebo Rhodes-Vivour. The report claimed Obi's chances were based on his campaign's ability to successfully turnout non-indigenes and educated youths along with the vital assistance of Rhodes-Vivour.

In early February, Lagos State polling data and analysis from Stears Business was released with results showed a 4% lead for Obi, its model based on the polling statistics predicted Obi to win the state with 44% of the vote with Tinubu trailing at 32% while Abubakar stood at just 7%. The Stears data revealed a stark religious divide as Obi led by 11% among Christian respondents while Tinubu led by 28% among Muslim respondents; other questions revealed that the respondents had high confidence in INEC and were more excited about the election than previous ones. In the following days other issues took precedence as allegations of bias against INEC Lagos State Resident Commissioner Olusegun Agbaje led to calls for his resignation while mass coordinated attacks on LP supporters before an Obi rally at Tafawa Balewa Square reinforced fears of further violence.

Polling

Projections

Conduct

Pre-election

General election

Results

By senatorial district 
The results of the election by senatorial district.

By federal constituency
The results of the election by federal constituency.

By local government area 
The results of the election by local government area.

See also 
 2023 Lagos State elections
 2023 Nigerian presidential election

Notes

References 

Lagos State gubernatorial election
2023 Lagos State elections
Lagos